Gerald James Foley (September 22, 1932 – December 8, 2021) was an American-born Canadian professional ice hockey right winger who played 142 games in the National Hockey League for the New York Rangers, Los Angeles Kings, and Toronto Maple Leafs between 1955 and 1968. The rest of his career, which lasted from 1952 to 1969, was spent in various minor leagues.

He was born in Ware, Massachusetts and raised in Garson, Ontario. While playing with the Seattle Bombers of the Western Hockey League (WHL) in 1952-53, Foley was named the WHL's rookie of the year.

Foley died on December 8, 2021, at the age of 89.

Career statistics

Regular season and playoffs

References

External links
 

1932 births
2021 deaths
American emigrants to Canada
American men's ice hockey right wingers
Buffalo Bisons (AHL) players
Canadian ice hockey right wingers
Denver Spurs (WHL) players
Ice hockey people from Ontario
Ice hockey players from Massachusetts
Los Angeles Kings players
New York Rangers players
Ottawa Senators (QSHL) players
People from Ware, Massachusetts
Pittsburgh Hornets players
St. Catharines Teepees players
Seattle Bombers players
Sportspeople from Greater Sudbury
Springfield Indians players
Springfield Kings players
Sudbury Wolves (EPHL) players
Toronto Maple Leafs players